Tyne Packet was launched in Newcastle-on-Tyne in 1803. She spent much of her brief career sailing between London and Dublin. Her crew had to abandon her on 26 September 1811 as she had taken on a lot of water and was in danger of sinking.

Career

Tyne Packet first appeared in Lloyd's Register (LR), in 1808. She did not appear in Lloyd's Lists ship arrival and departure data either until 1807–1808.

On 13 March 1808 Tyne Packet, Barber, master, lost her bowsprit in the Dublin River but sustained no other damage.

Fate
On 26 September 1811 her crew abandoned Tyne Packet, Morton, master, off Cape Finisterre. She had been sailing from St Ubes to Dublin when she developed leaks and had  of water in her hold. Gardner, Martens, master, took off the crew. Gardner had been sailing from Cork to Lisbon and put into Scilly on 6 October, having split her sails.

Citations

1803 ships
Ships built on the River Tyne
Age of Sail merchant ships of England
Maritime incidents in 1811